The 2018 Delaware State Treasurer election took place on November 6, 2018. The Delaware primary election for federal and state candidates took place on September 6, 2018. Incumbent State Treasurer Ken Simpler announced on November 2, 2017, that he would seek re-election to a second term. He lost the general election to Democratic nominee Colleen Davis.

Republican primary
Ken Simpler ran unopposed in the primary and automatically became the Republican nominee.

Candidates

Nominee
 Ken Simpler, incumbent State Treasurer

Democratic primary

Candidates

Nominee
 Colleen Davis, healthcare consultant

Green primary

Candidates

Nominee
 David Chandler, Green nominee for State Treasurer in 2014 and for State Senate in 2016

Endorsements

General election

Endorsements

Polling

Results

References

External links
Official campaign websites
Ken Simpler (R) for State Treasurer
Colleen Davis (D) for State Treasurer

treasurer
Delaware state treasurer elections
Delaware